Alexander Fisher may refer to:

Alexander Fisher (cricketer) (1908–1968), Australian cricketer
Alexander Fisher (sound engineer) (1903–1993), Sound engineer
Alexander Ingram Fisher (1875–1943), Canadian politician
Alexander Fisher (MP), English politician
Alexander Fisher (painter) (1864–1936), English Arts and Crafts enameller
Alex Fisher (born 1990), English footballer

See also
Alexander Fischer (born 1986), footballer
Alexander Fischer (figure skater), early 20th century Russian figure skater